Stephan Lill is a German guitarist best known for his work with the Progressive metal band Vanden Plas.

Biography 
Stephan Lill was born on 30 November 1968 in Eitorf, Germany. His interest in music, and especially in playing guitar, was awakened early with his discovery of AC/DC and their outstanding lead guitarist Angus Young  when he was 12.

At age 15, Stephan joined the band Vanden Plas. Since then, he has released 11 CDs worldwide with Vanden Plas, and performed in shows and tours in Europe and the US with bands including Dream Theater, Savatage, and Angra. 

As both guitarist and songwriter, Stephan collaborated in projects with Missa Mercuria and the Consortium Project. In addition, to date, he and his Vanden Plas bandmates have composed 4 rock operas  (Ludus Danielis, Christ 0, Everyman, Chronicles of the Immortals), which were performed at the Staatstheater am Gärtnerplatz/Munich, Theater Münster, Pfalztheater Kaiserslautern, Theater Pforzheim and the Tiroler Landestheater Innsbruck.

As a guitarist, Stephan has played throughout Germany in musicals including Jesus Christ Superstar, Little Shop of Horrors, Chess, Evita, and Rocky Horror Picture Show, to name a few.
In 2010, Stephan performed together with the Dortmund Philharmonic Orchestra in the German premiere of Yaron Gottfried's Concerto for Electric Guitar, String Orchestra and Percussion.
The American-based company TTM Guitars was so impressed with Stephan's playing that it has been building signature guitars for him since 2011.

Some of the bands Stephan likes to listen to are Blue Murder, In Flames, Metallica, Dream Theater, Slipknot, Ill Niño, Dokken, Ozzy Osbourne, Whitesnake, House of Lords, and AC/DC.
Other works from Stephan can be found on Missa Mercuria and the Consortium Project.

Instruments

Guitars
Hagstrom Northern Series Super Swede Black
TTM Supershop Devastator
TTM Stephan Lill Signature Series
Gibson Les Paul Studio (winered, VP, tuning: Eb)
Gibson Les Paul Custom (black, VP, tuning:Eb)
Epiphone Les Paul Custom (white, Theatre, tuning: 440 Hz)
Peavey Vandenberg Quilt Top (winered, VP, tuning: Eb)
Peavey V-Type Custom (purple, VP, tuning: Eb)
Ibanez Custom USA (petrol, Theatre, tuning: 443 Hz)
Ibanez RG 570 (yellow, Theatre, tuning: 440 Hz)
Ibanez RG 550 (red, Theatre, tuning: 443 Hz)
Yamaha Pacifica USA Custom 2 (natural, VP, tuning: 440 Hz)
Yamaha Pacifia 812 D (natural, VP, tuning: Eb)
Yamaha Pacifia 812 D (natural, VP, tuning: D)
Yamaha Drop 6 (black, VP, tuning: Bb)
Yamaha APX 10 A (Western, natural, VP, tuning: Eb)
Yamaha DW 4 (Western, natural, VP, tuning: Eb)
Yamaha GC-31 (Acoustic, natural, VP, tuning: Eb)

Amps
Engl Special Edition Preamp E 570
Engl Tube Poweramp E 840/50
Engl Cabinet 4x12" Pro Cabinet E 412 VS
Marshall JVM410H

Discography

With Vanden Plas
1994 - Colour Temple
1997 - The God Thing
1999 - Far Off Grace
2000 - Spirit of Live (live)
2002 - Beyond Daylight
2006 - Christ 0
2010 - The Seraphic Clockwork
2014 - Chronicles of The Immortals - Netherworld, Path 1
2015 - Chronicles of The Immortals - Netherworld II
2017 - The Seraphic Live works (Live CD/DVD)
2019 - The Epic Works 1991 - 2015 (Box Set)
2019 - The Ghost Xperiment - Awakening

With Missa Mercuria
Missa Mercuria (2002)

With Consortium Project
1999 - Criminals & Kings
2001 - Continuum in Extremis
2003 - Terra Incognita (The Undiscovered World)
2011 - Species

References

External links
Vanden Plas official website
Stephan Lill Bio
 https://www.ttmguitarsusa.com/stephan-lill

1968 births
Living people
German guitarists
German male guitarists
Progressive metal guitarists
Progressive rock guitarists